In God We Trust, Inc.: The Lost Tapes is VHS/DVD of the Dead Kennedys' first recording session of their EP, In God We Trust Inc.. It was released in July 2003. The session was filmed in June 1981 by Joe Rees at Target Video. When the DKs went to master the tape it started to peel and deteriorate, so they had to record it again (that session took place in August and was used for the EP). The video tapes of the session were in the DK's video collection. This film was directed and edited by Eric S. Goodfield and was released to celebrate the 25th anniversary of Dead Kennedys EP In God We Trust, Inc. It includes live versions of all the songs except "Hyperactive Child", for which no live footage could be found.

Track list

Studio versions
Hyperactive Child
Nazi Punks Fuck Off
Kepone Factory
Dogbite
Religious Vomit
We've Got a Bigger Problem Now
Rawhide
Moral Majority

Alternate versions
Hyperactive Child (studio version overlaying live montage)
Nazi Punks Fuck Off (live at the Ritz, Austin, Texas – August 7, 1982)
Kepone Factory (live at Mabuhay Gardens, San Francisco, California – October 10, 1979)
Dogbite (live at the Ritz, Austin, Texas – August 7, 1982)
Religious Vomit (live at the On Broadway, San Francisco, California – June 16, 1984)
We've Got a Bigger Problem Now (live at Mabuhay Gardens, San Francisco, California – April 4, 1981) 
Rawhide (live at the Island, Houston, Texas – August 18, 1984)
Moral Majority (live at the Keystone, Palo Alto, California – February 17, 1986)

References
 

Dead Kennedys